, or Choya, is a Japanese company headquartered in Habikino, Osaka, Japan, which specializes in the production and sales of umeshu plum liqueur. Its other main businesses include brandy, sake, wine, and foods. The company started producing umeshu in 1959. As of 2011, the company's products are distributed to more than 60 countries.

History 
1914: Started cultivating grapes.
1924: Company was established by Sumitaro Kondo. Started producing and selling wine.
1949: Started producing and selling brandy.
1951: Started producing and selling fruit wine.
1959: Started producing and selling ume fruit liqueur.
1962: Establishment of Choya Yoshu Jozo Co., Ltd.
1968: Started producing and selling medicinal herbal liqueur. Started exporting ume fruit liqueur.
1973: Started producing and selling medicinal liqueur.
2000: The company was renamed Choya Umeshu Co., Ltd.
2009: Launched a cosmetic brand "Choya Puranasu" as a mail-order product
2010: Company changes its logo to "Choya".

Main products
 Choya Umeshu
 Choya Soda
 Choya Soda 0% (Non-alcoholic soda)
 Choya Sarari
 Choya Excellent (Monde Selection, Grand Gold Quality Award)
 Choya Kokuto Umeshu (Monde Selection, Gold Quality Award) However, Monde Selection awards are non-competitive and only products that pay to enter are judged.

Production facilities
 Osaka Honsha Factory (Habikino, Osaka)
 Osaka Kawamukai Factory (Habikino, Osaka)
 Kishu Factory (Tanabe, Wakayama)
 Iga Ueno Factory (Iga, Mie)

References

External links
 
 Moodie International report

Drink companies of Japan
Food and drink companies established in 1914
Japanese companies established in 1914
Companies based in Osaka Prefecture